Vida Hope (16 December 1910 – 23 December 1963) was a British stage and film actress, who also directed stage productions.

Life and career
Born in Liverpool, Lancashire, to theatrical parents, she travelled widely as a child. She was "forbidden to go on the stage", so at age 16, became a typist in an advertising office, going on to write copy. At this time, however, she took every chance she got to take part in amateur dramatics, managing to get the lead roles in plays by Shaw, Ibsen, and Chekhov.

Following the role of the Fairy Wish-Fulfilment in the pantomime The Babes in the Wood at the Unity Theatre, London, she was, in 1939, offered a role by Herbert Farjeon in The Little Revue and worked in his revues for over three years. In 1940, she gave much support to and formed a strong friendship with Dirk Bogarde, in his first West End play, Diversions. During the Second World War, she became a regular singer at the Players' Theatre, where her repertoire included "Casey Jones", "Daddy Wouldn’t Buy Me a Bow-wow", "Dashing Away with the Smoothing Iron", "The Lady Wasn't Going that Way" and "You May Pet Me as Much as You Please".

She played a prominent role alongside Alec Guinness in the Academy Award-nominated film The Man in the White Suit as Bertha, in 1951.

Hope appeared in a range of roles in a production of Peer Gynt at the New Theatre in London (1944–45), directed the 1953 London production of The Boy Friend (and is also credited as director on the 'original cast' recording of 1954 starring Julie Andrews) and later directed Valmouth at the Lyric, Hammersmith (1958) and a revival of The Boy Friend at the Bristol Hippodrome (1958–59).

She was married to the film editor and director Derek Twist, and appeared in several of his films. She died in a road accident, on 23 December 1963, in Chelmsford, Essex, aged 53.

Partial filmography

 The 39 Steps (1935) - Usherette
 Champagne Charlie (1944) – Rosie
 English Without Tears (1944) 
 The Life and Adventures of Nicholas Nickleby (1946) – Fanny Squeers
 Hue and Cry (1947) – Mrs. Kirby
 The Mark of Cain (1947) – Jennie
 They Made Me a Fugitive (1947) – Mrs Fenshaw
 It Always Rains on Sunday (1947) – Mrs Wallis
 Woman Hater (1948)
 For Them That Trespass (1949) – Olive Mockson
 Paper Orchid (1949) – Jonquil Jones
 The Interrupted Journey (1949) – Miss Marchmont
 Double Confession (1950) – Madam Zilia
 The Woman in Question (1950) – Shirley Jones
 The Man in the White Suit (1951) – Bertha 
 Cheer the Brave (1951) 
 Green Grow the Rushes (1951) – Polly Bainbridge
 Angels One Five (1952) – W.A.A.F.
 Emergency Call (1952) – Brenda 
 The Long Memory (1952) – Alice Gedge
 Women of Twilight (1952) – Jess Smithson
 The Broken Horseshoe (1953) – Jackie Leroy
 Marilyn (1953) - Rosie
 Fast and Loose (1954) – Gladys
 Lease of Life (1954) - Mrs. Sproatley
 Charley Moon (1955) – staging of the musical numbers
 Rx Murder (1958) - Louise
 In the Doghouse (1961) – Mrs Crabtree

References

External links

1910 births
1963 deaths
Actresses from Liverpool
British stage actresses
British film actresses
British television actresses
20th-century English actresses
Road incident deaths in England
English theatre directors